WPJL (1240 kHz) is a commercial AM radio station licensed to Raleigh, North Carolina, and serving the Research Triangle.  The station airs a Christian talk and teaching radio format and is owned by WPJL, Inc.  Religious leaders heard on WPJL include Adrian Rogers, J. Vernon McGee, Joyce Meyer, Jim Daly, Nancy DeMoss Wolgemuth and Chuck Swindoll.

WPJL is powered at 1,000 watts non-directional.  The studios and transmitter are on Bart Street in Raleigh.

History
It was powered at 250 watts by day and 100 watts at night, broadcasting on 1210 kilocycles. The studios were on Salisbury Street in downtown Raleigh. In 1946, it added an FM station, 101.5 WRAL-FM and in 1956, it added a television station, WRAL-TV channel 8.

In 1941, the North American Regional Broadcasting Agreement (NARBA) was enacted.  That required WRAL to move to 1240 kHz.  During those early days, the station was a network affiliate of the Mutual Broadcasting System.  Capitol Broadcasting sold WRAL 1240 AM in 1965, but kept the sister stations WRAL-FM and WRAL-TV.  That required a change in its call sign, becoming WRNC, which stood for Raleigh, North Carolina. 

As WRNC, the station played Top 40 hits and then country music. In the 1960s the station was sold to Smiles Associates and in 1974 the format was changed to Christian radio.  In 1978 the call letters were changed from WRNC to WPJL (We Proclaim Jesus Lord).  The call sign was chosen to reflect the new orientation of the station.

References

External links

FCC History Cards for WPJL

PJL
Radio stations established in 1939
1939 establishments in North Carolina